William Stage may refer to:
 Charles W. Stage (1868–1946), American politician known as Billy Stage when he was a track athlete and baseball umpire
 Wm. Stage (born 1951), American journalist in the Midwest
 William "Stage" Boyd (1889–1935), American actor in New York
 Billy Stage (1893–1957), English footballer, formerly with Bury FC and other clubs